Suhail Mohammad Abdullatif (born 1961) is a Syrian politician. He has been the Public Works and Housing Minister since 2018.

Before becoming a minister, he held several public positions, such as the position of Diretor of General Establishment for Housing.

References 

Living people
1961 births
Damascus University alumni
21st-century Syrian politicians
Syrian ministers of public works